Amy Scott Galey is an American politician currently serving in the North Carolina Senate. A Republican from Burlington, North Carolina, she has represented the 25th district (including constituents in Alamance and Randolph counties) and its predecessors since 2021.

Electoral history

2022

2020

2018

Committee assignments

2021-2022 Session
Appropriations on Justice and Public Safety 
Education/Higher Education 
Judiciary 
State and Local Government

References

External links

|-

Living people
Year of birth missing (living people)
People from Burlington, North Carolina
University of North Carolina at Chapel Hill alumni
University of North Carolina School of Law alumni
County commissioners in North Carolina
Democratic Party North Carolina state senators
Women state legislators in North Carolina
21st-century American politicians
21st-century American women politicians